Underhill is a town in Chittenden County, Vermont, United States. The population was 3,129 at the 2020 census.

The town of Underhill shares a fire department with Jericho, the Underhill-Jericho Fire Department.

Geography
According to the United States Census Bureau, the town has a total area of 51.4 mi2 (133.1 km2), of which 51.3 mi2 (133.0 km2) is land and 0.1 mi2 (0.1 km2) (0.10%) is water.

The Browns River is the primary waterway within the town and originates as a stream from Mount Mansfield. It runs southwest and converges in the valley, just east of the village of Underhill Center with two other streams that also originate from Mount Mansfield; first with Stevensville Brook, and then with Clay Brook about  further. Harvey Brook, Cranes Brook, and Mill Brook draining from other hillsides within the town also converge with the Browns River in Underhill Center.

The town of Underhill contains two villages, Underhill Flats (shown on maps as "Underhill") and Underhill Center.  Both villages have U.S. post office buildings and are enumerated with ZIP codes 05489 (Underhill or Underhill Flats) and 05490 (Underhill Center).

Underhill Flats is located on the western side of the town along the Vermont Route 15 corridor, and is a shared jurisdiction with the adjacent town of Jericho. This area is otherwise known as the Underhill Incorporated District (i.e. Underhill ID) and includes the Riverside settlement in Jericho as well as the Flats settlement in Underhill. The Incorporated District was a unique authorization created by the Vermont legislature. It was listed as a designated historic Village Center; the Riverside Village Center by the former Department of Housing and Community Affairs (now known as the Agency of Commerce and Community Development) in 2010.  The United Church of Underhill Presbyterian Church, and the Underhill-Jericho main fire station are located on the Underhill side of the district. The majority of the district's geographic area lies within the Town of Jericho.

Underhill Center is an unincorporated village (i.e. not a legally defined entity) located around the intersection of River Road and Pleasant Valley Road, on the eastern side of the town closer to the foot of Mount Mansfield. Located within the village area are the Town Hall and municipal offices, the town hall park, a recreation area (with tennis courts, half-court for basketball, and a small swimming pond), Casey's Hill (a municipally owned sledding hill), and the St. Thomas Catholic Church.

Education

Underhill Independent Elementary school tested best in the county in reading proficiency in the New England Common Assessment Program test in 2008. Underhill Central stood first in math proficiency.

On November 4, 2014, the communities of Bolton, Jericho, Richmond, Underhill ID and Underhill Town voted to form the Mount Mansfield Modified Union School District also known as the MMMUSD.  
This new school district serves and governs the current town school districts of Bolton (Smilie Memorial School), Jericho (Jericho Elementary), Richmond (Richmond Elementary), Underhill ID School District (Underhill ID Elementary), Underhill Town (Underhill Central School), Mt Mansfield Union School District (Browns River Middle, Camels Hump Middle and Mt. Mansfield Union High Schools) in grades Pre-K through 12 and Huntington students grades 5–12.

Demographics

As of the census of 2000, there were 2,980 people, 1,055 households, and 853 families residing in the town. The population density was 58.0 people per square mile (22.4/km2). There were 1,088 housing units at an average density of 21.2 per square mile (8.2/km2). The racial makeup of the town was 98.49% White, 0.27% African American, 0.13% Native American, 0.20% Asian, 0.30% from other races, and 0.60% from two or more races. Hispanic or Latino of any race were 0.70% of the population.

There were 1,055 households, out of which 42.0% had children under the age of 18 living with them, 73.0% were married couples living together, 4.9% had a female householder with no husband present, and 19.1% were non-families. Of all households, 13.6% were made up of individuals, and 3.9% had someone living alone who was 65 years of age or older. The average household size was 2.82 and the average family size was 3.13.

In the town, the age distribution of the population shows 29.0% under the age of 18, 4.6% from 18 to 24, 32.6% from 25 to 44, 28.2% from 45 to 64, and 5.7% who were 65 years of age or older. The median age was 38 years. For every 100 females, there were 101.9 males. For every 100 females age 18 and over, there were 99.8 males.

The median income for a household in the town was $66,492, and the median income for a family was $69,837. Males had a median income of $46,949 versus $29,336 for females. The per capita income for the town was $26,746. About 2.8% of families and 5.2% of the population were below the poverty line, including 8.9% of those under age 18 and 1.7% of those age 65 or over.

Notable people 

 Vernon A. Bullard, United States Attorney for the District of Vermont
 Thomas Cale, non-voting congressman from the District of Alaska
 Pat Dealy, catcher with the St. Paul Saints, Boston Beaneaters, Washington Nationals, and Syracuse Stars
 Udney Hay, Deputy Quartermaster General of the Northern Department during the American Revolution and Vermont politician
 Bernard Joseph Leddy, US federal judge
 Richard Phillips, merchant mariner, captain of the Maersk Alabama in 2009 when it was hijacked by Somali pirates; the story was adapted into the 2013 film Captain Phillips

References

External links

 Official town site

 
Burlington, Vermont metropolitan area
Towns in Chittenden County, Vermont
Towns in Vermont